Guijo may refer to several places in Spain:
 Guijo de Ávila, in the province of Salamanca in Castile and León
 Guijo de Coria, in the province of Cáceres in Extremadura
 Guijo de Galisteo, in the province of Cáceres in Extremadura
 Guijo de Granadilla, in the province of Cáceres in Extremadura
 Guijo de Santa Bárbara, in the province of Cáceres in Extremadura

Other uses 

 Guijo (Shorea guiso), a tree of the family Dipterocarpaceae

See also
 El Guijo, in the province of Córdoba, Andalusia